Luis Fernando Flores Alvarado (born 7 July 1993), better known as Fernanfloo, is a Salvadoran gaming and comedy YouTuber. With a total of over 10 billion views, more than 541 videos, and 45 million subscribers, his channel is the 44th-most-subscribed channel on YouTube, and the fourth most-subscribed Spanish-speaking channel behind El Reino Infantil, Badabun and JuegaGerman. He is currently the most subscribed channel in El Salvador.

Career 
On 1 May 2011 he created his YouTube channel "Fernanfloo", whose name is a combination of his names Fernando Flores. At just 18 years of age, Fernanfloo began his YouTube career uploading video tutorials as well as short clips of action scenes with special effects. His first video was "Nightmare – Short Action Scene". Later on, he switched his content to gameplays of video games such as Call of Duty, God of War III and Mortal Kombat, gaining notoriety in the spanish-speaking youtube scene. 

In 2015, Fernanfloo in partnership with BBTV launched an app titled The Fernanfloo Game, which received 2.3 million downloads within its first week of release, and it was positioned as number 1 in 17 countries within 24 hours. In 2016 he was nominated for the MTV Millennial Awards, in the category of "Digital Icon of the Year". In 2017 he was again nominated for the MTV Millennial Awards, in the "Miaw icon of the Year" and "Celebrity Challenge" categories.

In 2017, Fernanfloo participated in the Ecuadorian film Dedicada a mi Ex, briefly playing as a waiter. This film was released on 8 November 2019 in Ecuador and later was available on Netflix. In August 2017, he announced the publication of his first book, a graphic novel titled Curly está en peligro. 

After a four-month hiatus, he uploaded a video entitled "Se Acabó" ("It's Finished"), in which he stated that: "Things are really going to change. You will not see many videos as there have been during these seven years that you they have accompanied me throughout this journey". Fernanfloo opted to create a Twitch channel to stream games, primarily Fortnite. In May of the same year, he created another YouTube channel called "Fernan", which contains clips from his Twitch streams.

In January 2019, he announced his collaboration with game developer Capcom to have himself on the Resident Evil 2 remake, in a video titled "Soy un Zombie" (I'm a Zombie), Fernan relates that he went to Japan to have makeup done and his movements captured to be one of the many zombies in the game, later in that same video a trailer appears promoting the 1-Shot Demo. In 2020 the developer BBTV announced the release of Fernanfloo Party, game that was available at the end of the same year on iOS and Android.

On 16 September 2021, the YouTuber Bambiel, known for his song titled "El Rap de Fernanfloo" ("Fernanfloo Rap"), he collaborated with Fernanfloo for a rap song entirely dedicated to the haters. The music video accumulated more than 4 million visits and became number 2 in trends, later on 24 September 2021, accumulated 10 million visits. In January 2022, he appeared in a collaboration as host of Peruvian YouTuber Mox's "Whatdafaqshow" channel.

Personal life 
Luis Fernando Flores Alvarado was born on 7 July 1993 in San Salvador, El Salvador. Fernanfloo has identified himself as agnostic.

Awards and nominations

See also 
 List of YouTubers

References

External links 

Fernanfloo at YouTube
Fernan at YouTube

1993 births
Gaming YouTubers
Living people
Spanish-language YouTubers
Salvadoran YouTubers
People from San Salvador
Comedy YouTubers
YouTube vloggers
YouTube animators
Twitch (service) streamers
Salvadoran novelists